is a Japanese wrestler. He competed in the men's freestyle 100 kg at the 1976 Summer Olympics.

References

1954 births
Living people
Japanese male sport wrestlers
Olympic wrestlers of Japan
Wrestlers at the 1976 Summer Olympics
Place of birth missing (living people)
20th-century Japanese people